Édouard Isidore Buguet (1840–1901) was a French medium and spirit photographer.

Buguet became a "sensation" among spiritualists during the early 1870s. He was even loaned money to set up his own studio. In June 1875, a police sting operation in Paris discovered that Buguet's photographic plates had pre-exposed images on them. After the exposure, Buguet admitted in court that his photographs were fraudulent. He was convicted and served a year jail time. According to the magician Harry Houdini, the police discovered figures and doll heads at Buguet's studio. He had used these as his "spirit" extras. Houdini noted that although Buguet was exposed as a fraud and he had confessed, some spiritualists still insisted his spirit photographs were genuine.

The English medium Stainton Moses had supported Buguet in an article for Human Nature in May 1875. After Buguet was exposed later in the same year, Moses insisted that Buguet was still a genuine medium and he had been bribed to make a false confession. The case has been cited by researchers as an example of spiritualists willing to believe and refusing to accept evidence of fraud.

References

1840 births
1901 deaths
French spiritual mediums
Place of birth missing